Heathylee is a civil parish in the district of Staffordshire Moorlands, Staffordshire, England. It contains eleven listed buildings that are recorded in the National Heritage List for England. All the listed buildings are designated at Grade II, the lowest of the three grades, which is applied to "buildings of national importance and special interest".  The parish contains the village of Upper Hulme, and is otherwise rural.  The listed buildings consist of a house and farmhouses, a former sawmill, a public house, and five mileposts, four of them along the A54 road.


Buildings

References

Citations

Sources

Lists of listed buildings in Staffordshire